The Bataan-Corregidor Memorial Bridge, also known as the State Street Bridge, is a bridge that carries State Street across the Chicago River in downtown Chicago, Illinois, United States.

History
The current bridge was started in 1939, but material shortages in World War II caused a delay in completion until 1949.

References

External links
 

1949 establishments in Illinois
Bascule bridges in the United States
Bridges completed in 1949
Bridges in Chicago